This is a list of gliders/sailplanes of the world, (this reference lists all gliders with references, where available) 
Note: Any aircraft can glide for a short time, but gliders are designed to glide for longer.

Brazilian miscellaneous constructors 
 Aeromot AMT-100 Ximango — AEROMOT — Aeronaves e Motores S/A
 Aeromot AMT-200 Super Ximango — AEROMOT — Aeronaves e Motores S/A
 Aeromot AMT-300 Turbo Ximango Shark — AEROMOT — Aeronaves e Motores S/A
 Agripino Souza AMX-3 — Souza, Agripino
 CAP Alcatraz — Companhia Aeronáutica Paulista — Brazil
 CEA-101 CB.1 Gaivota — de Barros, Cláudio — "CEA — UFMG”
 CEA CB.2 Minuano — de Barros, Cláudio — "CEA — UFMG”
 EAY Primário — Empresa Aeronáutica Ypiranga
 EAY Secundário — Empresa Aeronáutica Ypiranga
 Embraer EMB 400 Urupema — Instituto Tecnológico de Aeronáutica de São José dos Campos / Empresa Brasileira de Aeronáutica — Brazil
 HW-4 Flamingo — Widmer, Hans
 IPD Urubu — Centro Técnico Aeroespacial (CTA) — São José dos Campos (SP)
 IPD Periquito — Pessotti, Guido — Centro Técnico Aeroespacial (CTA)
 IPE 02 Nhapecan — Boscardin, João Carlos — Indústria Paranaense de Estruturas, Curitiba (PR)
 IPT-1 Gafanhoto — Instituto de Pesquisas Tecnológicas - São Paulo
 IPT-2 Aratinga — Instituto de Pesquisas Tecnológicas - São Paulo
 IPT-3 Saracura — Instituto de Pesquisas Tecnológicas - São Paulo
 IPT-5 Jaraguá — Instituto de Pesquisas Tecnológicas - São Paulo
 IPT-6 Stratus — Instituto de Pesquisas Tecnológicas - São Paulo
 IPT-12 Caboré — Instituto de Pesquisas Tecnológicas - São Paulo
 IPT-14 Marreco — Instituto de Pesquisas Tecnológicas - São Paulo
 ITA P-1 — Schubert, Ekkehard — Instituto Tecnológico de Aeronáutica — São José dos Campos (SP)
 Juvenelle Rosario Skua — Florianópolis, Brazil
 Romagna Larus QR-15 — Romagna, Quintino
 Neiva B Monitor — “Industria Aeronautica Neiva”. Neiva, Jose Carlos
 Neiva BN-1 — “Industria Aeronautica Neiva”. Neiva, Jose Carlos
 PCB-1 — Planador Clube do Brasil — Rio de Janeiro (RJ)
 Professor — Ponta Grossa (PR)
 Reis BG 12-16 — Reis, Osório 
 Rio Claro Araponga — de Oliveira, Sílvio — Aero Clube de Rio Claro, Rio Claro (SP)
 Santa Maria SM-1 — Hausen, João Carlos 
 Santa Maria SM-2 — Hausen, João Carlos 
 Santa Maria SM-3 — Hausen, João Carlos 
 Santa Cruz do Sul S.C.S.1 — Lohre, Rudolf — Wenneck, Gustav — Santa Cruz do Sul (RS)
 Santa Cruz do Sul S.C.S.2 — Lohre, Rudolf — Santa Cruz do Sul (RS)
 Schubert P-1 — Schubert, Ekkehard Carlos Fernando – TECSIS, Sorocaba (SP)
 SP-19 Galinha — Instituto de Pesquisas Tecnológicas - São Paulo
 SP-21 Ganso — Instituto de Pesquisas Tecnológicas - São Paulo
 Sidou João Grande — Eng. Antônio Menezes Sidou
 Widmaier GB-1 Quero — Widmaier, Kuno
 Widmaier KW-1 Quero Quero — Widmaier, Kuno — IPE (Industria Paranaense de Estruturas)
 Widmaier KW 2 Biguá — Widmaier, Kuno

Notes

Further reading

External links

Lists of glider aircraft